Austin-Healey was a British sports car maker established in 1952 through a joint venture between the Austin division of the British Motor Corporation (BMC) and the Donald Healey Motor Company (Healey), a renowned automotive engineering and design firm. Leonard Lord represented BMC and Donald Healey his firm.

BMC merged with Jaguar Cars in 1966 to form British Motor Holdings (BMH). Donald Healey left BMH in 1968 when it merged into British Leyland. Healey then joined Jensen Motors, which had been making bodies for the "big Healeys" since their inception in 1952, and became their chairman in 1972. Austin-Healey cars were produced until 1972 when the 20-year agreement between Healey and Austin came to an end.

Models built

Austin-Healey 100

Open 2-seater (minimal weather protection)
 1953–55 BN1 Austin-Healey 100
 1955 Austin-Healey 100S (Limited production—50 race-prepared cars)
 1955–56 BN2 Austin-Healey 100 and 100M

Austin-Healey 100-6

Open 2+2-seater
 1956–57 BN4 Austin-Healey 100-6 (2+2 roadster)
 1957–59 BN4 Austin-Healey 100-6 Change to -inch SU Carbs (2+2 roadster)
 1958–59 BN6 Austin-Healey 100-6 6-Cylinder (2-seater roadster)

Austin-Healey 3000

Open 2+2-seater
 1959–61 BN7 Mark I (2-seater roadster), BT7 Mark I (2+2 roadster)
 1961–62 BN7 Mark II (2-seater roadster), BT7 Mark II (2+2)

Convertible 2+2-seater (wind-up windows)

 1962–63 BJ7 Mark II (2+2 convertible)
 1963–67 BJ8 Mark III (2+2 convertible)

Austin-Healey Sprite

Open 2-seater
 1958–61 AN5 Mark I (UK: "Frogeye"; US: "Bugeye")
 1961–64 HAN6–HAN7 Mark II
2-seater Roadster
 1964–66 HAN8 Mark III (roll-up windows)
 1966–69 HAN9 Mark IV
 1969–70 HAN10 Mark IV (UK only)
 1971 AAN10 Mark IV (UK only; badged as Austin rather than Austin-Healey)

Concept Cars

 Austin-Healey Project Tempest (2005)

Racing
The Austin Healey was extensively raced by the Donald Healey Motor Company in Europe at Le Mans and at Sebring in the U.S., in classic rallies by the BMC competitions department, and was recognised from the very beginning by the Sports Car Club of America (SCCA). Healey models raced in club racing in D, E, F, G, an H production classes, winning National Championships in all five classes. The last Big Healey to win an SCCA National Championship was the class E Production Austin-Healey 100-6 driven by Alan Barker at the Daytona ARRC in 1965. 

In 1953, a special streamlined Austin-Healey set several land speed records at the Bonneville Salt Flats in Utah, USA.

Successors
The name Austin is now owned by Nanjing, which bought the assets of  MG Rover Group (British Leyland's successor company) out of bankruptcy in 2005. After Donald Healey sold his original business, Donald Healey Motor Company, the Healey brand was registered to a new firm, Healey Automobile Consultants, which the Healey family sold to HFI Automotive in 2005.

In June 2007, Nanjing and Healey Automobile Consultants / HFI Automotive signed a collaborative agreement that aims to recreate the Austin Healey and Healey marques alongside NAC's MG. No timeline has been given as to when the Healey and Austin-Healey brands will return, although MG will be back on the market in China and the UK by the year's end.

See also 
 Donald Healey Motor Company for the models made by the independent Healey company.
 Nash-Healey for a Nash-engined pre-Austin sports car by Donald Healey.
 Jensen-Healey for a later Donald Healey designed sports car.
 List of car manufacturers of the United Kingdom

References

Defunct motor vehicle manufacturers of the United Kingdom
Sports car manufacturers
British Leyland vehicles
1960s cars
British companies established in 1952
Vehicle manufacturing companies established in 1952
Manufacturing companies disestablished in 1972
1952 establishments in England
1972 disestablishments in England
Defunct manufacturing companies of England
Joint ventures
Healey